Graeme Banks (born 19 May 1969) is an Australian diver. He competed in two events at the 1988 Summer Olympics.

References

External links
 

1969 births
Living people
Australian male divers
Olympic divers of Australia
Divers at the 1988 Summer Olympics
Divers from Sydney
20th-century Australian people
21st-century Australian people